Brian Dobson may refer to:

 Brian Dobson (archaeologist) (1931–2012), English archaeologist
 Brian Dobson (footballer) (born 1934), English footballer
 Bryan Dobson (born 1960), Irish journalist
 Brian Dobson (actor), English–Canadian voice actor